Mammoth Records was an independent record label founded in 1989 by Jay Faires in the Carrboro area of Chapel Hill, North Carolina. The majority of the acts on Mammoth were executive-produced by Faires and the label's general manager, Steve Balcom. The label was the first independent to produce two platinum records.

Mammoth's roster included Antenna, The Backsliders, Bandit Queen, The Bats, Blake Babies, Chainsaw Kittens, Clarissa. Dash Rip Rock, Dillon Fence, Frente!, Fu Manchu, Fun-Da-Mental, Jason & the Scorchers, Jocelyn Montgomery, Joe Henry, Juliana Hatfield, Kill Creek, Machines of Loving Grace, Mark Lizotte, My Friend Steve, Pure, Seven Mary Three, Squirrel Nut Zippers, The Hope Blister, The Melvins, The Sidewinders, Vanilla Trainwreck, and Victoria Williams.

History 
Mammoth first signed Tucson band The Sidewinders; The Sidewinder's debut album, Witchdoctor, sold to RCA within Mammoth's first three months of business. Another early signing, Blake Babies, led by Berklee School of Music students Juliana Hatfield and John Strohm, released “Earwig” and “Sunburn” with Mammoth before breaking up. John Strohm went on to release two solo albums with Mammoth under the moniker Antenna while Juliana Hatfield released solo efforts Hey Babe and Only Everything with Mammoth. Louisiana Music Hall of Famer Dash Rip Rock signed to Mammoth with its 1989 release, Ace of Clubs, produced by Jim Dickinson. Chainsaw Kittens released four albums with Mammoth, including its second album, Flipped Out in Singapore, which was Butch Vig’s follow-up project after producing Nirvana’s Nevermind.

The first signing from the local Chapel Hill college scene was Dillion Fence; the group released three albums on the Mammoth label between 1991 and 1995. Also from the local area, Mammoth signed Vanilla Trainwreck; the band released Sofa Livin’ Dreamazine and two other albums. After The Sidewinders, a second Tucson band—Machines of Loving Grace—was signed to Mammoth. That band released three albums with Mammoth between 1991 and 1995 with the album Concentration gaining national attention. Multiple Grammy Award winner Joe Henry released albums with Mammoth between 1992 and 2001, including Trampoline and Fuse. Through a distribution deal with Les Claypool’s Prawn Song Records, Mammoth released The Charlie Hunter Trio’s self-titled album in 1993; Charlie Hunter went on to sign with the jazz label Blue Note Records. The label’s early success across a spectrum of genres with acts like Blake Babies, Chainsaw Kittens, Dash Rip Rock, Dillon Fence, Juliana Hatfield, Joe Henry and Machines of Loving Grace attracted the attention of Atlantic Records.  Mammoth and Atlantic Records formed a joint venture in 1992.

During the Atlantic era, Mammoth signed Frente!. Frente!’s cover of New Order’s “Bizarre Love Triangle” went Top 10 on Billboard Modern Rock Charts, and its record, Marvin The Album, shipped more than 750,000 copies worldwide. The label also added Victoria Williams to its roster, releasing her albums, Loose and This Moment: In Toronto with the Loose Band. Mammoth set a precedent for recognizing and promoting female, alternative voices with acts, such as The Black Girls, Blake Babies, Juliana Hatfield, Frente!, and Victoria Williams. Frente!, which MTV labeled "Buzz Bin", and Hatfield both sold more than 250,000 records.

When Chris Douridas was the director of music at KCRW, Mammoth teamed with the radio station to release Rare on Air, a four-part compilation series featuring artists such as Radiohead, Tori Amos, Lindsey Buckingham, Los Lobos, Beck, Nick Cave, John Cale, World Party, Philip Glass, The Cranberries, Jackson Browne, Fiona Apple, Ben Folds, James Taylor, Ani Difranco, Randy Newman, Jeff Buckley, Mazzy Starr, Patti Smith, Tom Waits, PJ Harvey and Lucinda Williams.

Nashville-based Jason and the Scorchers had a second life after signing with Mammoth Records and released three albums with the label. In 1996, the New Orleans Dirty Dozen Brass Band, released Ears to the Wall with Mammoth, an album  produced by The Black Crowes’ Chris Robinson. Seven Mary Three recorded three albums between 1995 and 1998 with Mammoth. Its debut album, American Standard, sold 1.3 million copies aloft the single "Cumbersome", making Seven Mary Three the record label's first platinum seller.

In 1997, Mammoth Records returned to an independent label. Squirrel Nut Zippers released six albums with Mammoth from 1994 to 2000; its second album, Hot, was released towards the end of 1996 and climbed the charts as Mammoth separated from Atlantic. Hot became Mammoth's second platinum record. As an independent, the label also saw the release of Jocelyn Montgomery's “Et Ideo,” produced by David Lynch.

Later, Mammoth made headway with big beat and the early electronic movement from the United Kingdom with bands like The Freestylers, which MTV deemed “Buzzworthy,” and The Wiseguys, whose single “Ooh La La” on The Antidote became a breakout party anthem. Founder of British label 4AD and leader of This Mortal Coil, Ivo Watts-Russell released his band The Hope Blisters' album Smiles OK on Mammoth in the U.S, an album including work from by other artists, including Brian Eno and John Cale.

Mammoth artists were featured on soundtracks for The Crow (Machines of Loving Grace) alongside Nine Inch Nails and Rage Against the Machine, The Crow: City of Angels (Seven Mary Three) alongside Hole and White Zombie, Hurricane Streets (Pure and Seven Mary Three) alongside Mary's Playground and Xzibit, My So Called Life (Frente!, Chainsaw Kittens and Juliana Hatfield) alongside Sonic Youth and The Lemonheads, Trey Parker and Matt Stone’s Orgazmo (The Dust Brothers) alongside Wu-Tang Clan and Dilated Peoples, the triple platinum album for Reality Bites (Juliana Hatfield) alongside Lisa Loeb and U2, Saturday Morning Cartoons (Frente! and Juliana Hatfield) alongside Matthew Sweet and the Ramones, and the compilation album Music for Our Mother Ocean (Seven Mary Three) alongside the Beastie Boys and No Doubt.

The success of the Squirrel Nut Zippers' albums, along with the development of other Mammoth bands—like Pure with Generation Six-Pack, Fu Manchu, and the Backsliders—focused the industry’s attention on the newly independent Mammoth.
The label sold to The Walt Disney Company in late 1997.

Discography

1988

A Picture Made - "Past"
The Downsiders - All My Friends Are Fish

1989
Blackgirls - Procedure
Dash Rip Rock - Ace of Clubs
The Sidewinders - Witchdoctor
Blake Babies - Sunburn

1990
Chainsaw Kittens - Violent Religion
Dash Rip Rock - Not of This World
Frequency - North Carolina Compilation
The Sidewinders - Auntie Ramos' Pool Hall
Joe Henry - Shuffletown

1991
Antenna - Sway
Blackgirls - Happy 
Dash Rip Rock - Boiled Alive
Machines of Loving Grace - Machines of Loving Grace
Vanilla Trainwreck - Sofa Livin' Dreamazine

1992
The Bats - Fear of God
Big Wheel - Holiday Manor
Chainsaw Kittens - Flipped Out in Singapore
Dillon Fence - Rosemary
Joe Henry - Short Man's Room
Juliana Hatfield - Hey Babe
Vanilla Trainwreck - Sounding to Try Like You

1993
Antenna - Hideout
The Bats - Silverbeet
Blake Babies - Innocence & Experience
Chainsaw Kittens - Angel on the Range (EP)
Charlie Hunter Trio - Charlie Hunter Trio
Dillon Fence - Outside In
Jacobites - Jacobites
Joe Henry - Kindness of the World
The Juliana Hatfield Three - Become What You Are
M.I.R.V. - Cosmodrome
Machines of Loving Grace - Concentration
Various - Cocktails at Five - Mammoth's First Five Years
Various - They Went Thatta Way!
Fun-Da-Mental - "Countryman"/"Tribal Revolution"

1994
Alphabet Soup - Take a Ride
Banco de Gaia - Maya
The Bats - Daddy's Highway
The Bats - The Law of Things
Blake Babies - Nicely, Nicely
Chainsaw Kittens - Pop Heiress
Dillon Fence - Living Room Scene
Frente! - Marvin the Album
Kevin Kinney - Down Out Law
Kill Creek - St. Valentine's Garage
Laundry - Blacktongue
Machines Of Loving Grace - "Butterfly Wings" (single)
Porch - Porch
Vanilla Trainwreck - Mordecai
Various - Jabberjaw: Good To The Last Drop
Various - Rare On Air (Live Performances Vol. One)
Velo-Deluxe - Superelastic
Victoria Williams - Loose
Victoria Williams - Swing The Statue!
Pure - "Anna is a Speed Freak"

1995
Alphabet Soup - Layin' Low in the Cut
Banco De Gaia - Last Train to Lhasa
Bandit Queen - Hormone Hotel
The Bats - Couchmaster
Eat Static - Abduction
Eat Static - Implant 
Eskimo - The Further Adventures of Der Shrimpkin
Fun-Da-Mental - Seize the Time
Jason & the Scorchers - A Blazing Grace
Johnette Napolitano & Holly Vincent - Vowel MovementJuliana Hatfield - Only EverythingMachines of Loving Grace - GiltSeven Mary Three - American StandardSquirrel Nut Zippers - The InevitableTimeShard - Crystal OscillationsVarious - Feed Your Head Volume 1Various - Feed Your Head Volume 2Various - Quadruped V.1Various - Rare On Air: Volume 2 (Live Sessions From KCRW's Morning Becomes Eclectic)Various - Transmissions From The Planet DogVarious - Up & Down Club Sessions Vol. 1Various - Up & Down Club Sessions Vol. 2Victoria Williams - This Moment in Toronto with the Loose Band1996
Banco de Gaia - Live At GlastonburyChildren of the Bong - Sirius SoundsClarissa - SilverThe Dirty Dozen Brass Band - Ears to the WallFrente! - ShapeFu Manchu - In Search Of...Future Loop Foundation - Time and BassJack Drag - Jack DragJason & the Scorchers - Clear Impetuous MorningJason & the Nashville Scorchers - Reckless Country SoulJoe Henry - TrampolineKill Creek - Proving Winter CruelMelvins - StagPure - Generation Six-PackThe Raymond Brake - Never Work EverSeven Mary Three - "Water's Edge" (single)
Squirrel Nut Zippers - HotTimeShard - Hunab KuVarious - Jabberjaw Vol. 2: Pure Sweet HellVarious - MTV Buzz Bin: Volume 1Various - Planet Dub1997
The Backsliders - Throwin' Rocks at the MoonBanco De Gaia - Big Men CryClarissa - Blood and CommonsEat Static - Science of the GodsElevate Interior - Fabric Woolly MammothFu Manchu - The Action is GoJack Drag - Unisex HeadwaveJames Mathus and His Knock-Down Society - Play Songs for RosettaSeven Mary Three - RockCrownSquirrel Nut Zippers - "Hell" (single)
Strangefolk - Weightless in WaterTwo Dollar Pistols - On Down the TrackVarious - Feed Your Head Volume 3 - Accelerating The Alpha RhythmsVarious - Hurricane Streets (Music From The Motion Picture)Various - MTV Buzz Bin: Volume 2Various - Rare On Air: Volume 3Various - Tranced Out and Dreaming1998
April March - Lessons of April MarchCreeper Lagoon - I Become Small and GoFar Too Jones - Picture Postcard Walls
The Hope Blister - ...smile's OKJason & the Scorchers - Midnight Roads & Stages SeenJocelyn Montgomery with David Lynch - Lux VivensMy Friend Steve - Hope and WaitNatural Calamity - Peach HeadPure - "Feverish" (single)
Seven Mary Three - Orange Ave.Squirrel Nut Zippers - Christmas CaravanSquirrel Nut Zippers - Perennial FavoritesVarious - Mammoth Records 1988-1998 A Sound DecadeVarious - Music From the X-Games Volume 3Various - Rare On Air Volume 4The Wiseguys - The Antidote1999
10¢ - Buggin' OutA - A vs. Monkey KongApril March - Chrominance DecoderThe Blacksliders - Southern LinesThe Dirty Dozen Brass Band - Buck JumpFreestylers - We Rock HardFu Manchu - King of the RoadJoe Henry - FuseKatharine Whalen's Jazz Squad - Katharine Whalen's Jazz SquadMark Lizotte - Soul Lost CompanionMedina Green - "I See"/"Full Court Press"
Splendid - Have You Got a Name For ItStrangefolk - A Great Long WhileStyles of Beyond - 2000 FoldVarious - Morning Becomes Eclectic2000
Frankie Machine - OneJohn Wesley Harding - The Confessions of St. AceSquirrel Nut Zippers - Bedlam Ballroom
The Young Fresh Fellows/The Minus 5 - Because We Hate You/Let the War Against Music Begin

2001
James Mathus and His Knock-Down Society - National Antiseptic
Joe Henry - Scar
Joe Henry - Selections
John Wesley Harding - I'm Wrong About Everything
Seven Mary Three - The Economy of Sound

2002
A - Hi-Fi Serious
Freestylers - Pressure Point
Fu Manchu - California Crossing
Los Lobos - Good Morning Aztlán
Schatzi - Fifty Reasons to Explode
Scapegoat Wax - SWAX

2004
Los Lobos - The Ride

2005
Various - Look at All the Love We Found: A Tribute to Sublime

2006
Los Lobos - The Town and the City

References 

Record labels established in 1989
Record labels disestablished in 2006
Alternative rock record labels
American independent record labels
Defunct record labels of the United States
Disney Music Group